Wood Mountain 160 is an Indian reserve of the Wood Mountain Lakota First Nation in Saskatchewan. It is 135 kilometres southwest of Moose Jaw. In the 2016 Canadian Census, it recorded a population of 20 living in 11 of its 14 total private dwellings.

References

Division No. 3, Saskatchewan
Indian reserves in Saskatchewan